Ziyad Marar is an author and President of Global Publishing at SAGE Publishing. He was born in 1966 in Iraq, and moved to London aged 10. He has published four books combining his interests in psychology and philosophy. His fourth Judged: The Value of Being Misunderstood was published in 2018.

Biography 
Marar was born in 1966 in Baghdad, Iraq, then lived in Riyadh, Saudi Arabia and Beirut, Lebanon before moving with his family to London in the late 1970s. He attended Exeter University where he obtained a BSc in psychology. He completed an MA in the philosophy and psychology of language from Birkbeck, University of London. Marar joined SAGE in 1989 and has worked across all aspects of publishing. He was appointed Editorial Director in 1997, Deputy Managing Director in 2006, and took on a more global role in 2010 as Global Publishing Director. In 2016, Marar was promoted to President, Global Publishing where he has overall responsibility for SAGE's publishing strategy .

In recent years at SAGE, Marar has also focused on supporting the social sciences more generally. He has spoken and written on this theme in various international contexts. In early 2015 was appointed to the board of the Campaign for Social Science (CfSS) and in 2020 he was elected as a fellow of the Academy of Social Science, an event he reflected on in a widely read article for Social Science Space.
In 2015, Marar was invited to sit on the board of trustees for the UK academic news site, The Conversation.

He also sits on the boards of the Big House Theatre Company, and The Ceasefire Centre for Civilian Rights.

Marar has written four books. The Happiness Paradox (2003; covering how philosophy and psychology can create a better understanding of modern identity),  Deception (2008; about people's relationship with truth and the possibility of a truly honest life) and Intimacy (2012). and Judged: The Value of Being Misunderstood (2018).

He lives in London with his wife and three daughters.

Marar tweets @ZiyadMarar

Books
 Judged: The Value of Being Misunderstood, Bloomsbury, 2018
 Intimacy: Understanding the Subtle Power of Human Connection,  Acumen Publishing 2012
Deception, Acumen Publishing 2008
The Happiness Paradox, Reaktion Books 2003

References

External links
 Profile at Greene Heaton
 Interview with Little Atoms
Response to annual Edge Question
   2017: What scientific term of concept ought to be more widely known?
       https://www.edge.org/response-detail/27118
   2016: What to you consider the most interesting recent scientific news? What makes it important?
        https://www.edge.org/response-detail/26755
   2015: What do you think about machines that think?
        https://www.edge.org/response-detail/26105
 SAGE Connection: What's the big deal about big data?
 Times Higher Education: Academic freedom and freedom of voice: Yale's ‘shrieking girl’ and the rush to judgement 
 The Guardian: Unloved and sidelined – why are social sciences ignored by politicians
 The Bookseller – Opinion piece on Social Science in the US
 Research Information  – Interview on eBook Development
 YouTube – Campaign for Social Sciences Annual Lecture
 The Guardian: Why Does Social Science have such a hard job explaining itself?
 Open Access essay published with the British Academy 
 The Guardian: Social Sciences need a collective voice
 Research Information – Opinion blog on cuts to social science funding 
 Times Higher Education: Self Confidence crisis in social research

1966 births
Iraqi writers
Living people